Tayla Predebon (born 20 November 2000) is an Australian professional rugby league footballer who currently plays for the Newcastle Knights in the NRL Women's Premiership. She previously played for the Sydney Roosters.

Background
Born in Gloucester, New South Wales, Predebon grew up playing netball and rugby league.

Playing career

Early years
In 2018 and 2019, Predebon represented the CRL Newcastle side. In 2020, she joined the Central Coast Roosters in the NSWRL Women's Premiership.

2022
Predebon joined the Sydney Roosters NRLW squad in 2022. In round 1 of the delayed 2021 NRL Women's season, she made her NRLW debut for the Roosters against the Brisbane Broncos. She played in the Roosters' 2021 Grand Final win over the St. George Illawarra Dragons.

In June, she signed with the Newcastle Knights for the 2022 season. She made her club debut for the Knights in round 1 of the 2022 NRLW season against the Brisbane Broncos, scoring a try in the Knights' 32-14 win.

On 2 October, Predebon played in the Knights' 2022 NRLW Grand Final win over the Parramatta Eels.

References

External links
Newcastle Knights profile
Sydney Roosters profile

2000 births
Australian female rugby league players
Sydney Roosters (NRLW) players
Newcastle Knights (NRLW) players
Rugby league props
Living people